Robert FitzEdith, feudal lord of Okehampton (1093–1172) was an illegitimate son of Henry I of England and Edith Forne, who was a mistress of Henry I. Compared to many of his illegitimate siblings and half-siblings, not much is known about him. Robert married Matilda d'Avranches, heiress of the feudal barony of Okehampton, Devon, and widow of William de Courcy. They had one daughter, Maud, who married Renaud, Sire of Courtenay (son of Miles, Sire of Courtenay and Ermengarde of Nevers). Robert died of natural causes.

References

1093 births
1172 deaths
Illegitimate children of Henry I of England
11th-century English people
12th-century English people
Sons of kings